is an electoral district of the Japanese House of Representatives. The district was created in 1994 as part of the move to single-member constituencies, and it is currently represented by the Liberal Democratic Party's Tatsuya Ito.

Areas Covered

Current District 
As of 13 January 2023, the areas covered by this district are as follows:

 Mitaka
 Chōfu
 Komae

As part of the 2022 reapportionments, the remaining sections of Inagi were given to the new 30th district.

Areas from 2017-2022 
From the second redistricting in 2017 until the third redistricting in 2022, the areas covered by this district were as follows:

 Mitaka
 Chōfu
 Komae
 Parts of Inagi
 Yanoguchi, Higashi Naganuma, Daimura, Hyakumura, Oshidate, Koyodai 1-6

As part of the 2017 redistricting, parts of Inagi city were transferred to the 21st district.

Areas from 2002-2017 
From the first redistricting in 2002 until the second redistricting in 2017, the areas covered by this district were as follows:

 Mitaka
 Chōfu
 Komae
 Inagi

As part  of the 2002 redistricting, Fuchū was moved to the 18th district and Mitaka was gained from that same district.

Areas from before 2002 
From the founding of this district in 1994 until the first redistricting in 2002, the areas covered by this district were as follows:

 Fuchu
 Chōfu
 Komae
 Inagi

History

Elected Representatives

Election Results 
‡ - Also ran for the Tokyo PR district

‡‡ - Also ran for and was elected to the Tokyo PR district

References 

Districts of the House of Representatives (Japan)
Politics of Tokyo